Darren Dowling (born 22 February 1968 in Watford) is a British racing driver.



Career

British Touring Car Championship

Dowling drove the final six rounds of the British Touring Car Championship in 2006. He raced in a Lexus IS200 for the newly formed BTC Racing team alongside team-mate Chris Stockton. His best ever finish was a fourteenth position at Silverstone, ending the season with no points. The team continued in 2007, but he was replaced by Nick Leason.

Racing record

Complete British Touring Car Championship results
(key) (Races in bold indicate pole position - 1 point awarded in first race) (Races in italics indicate fastest lap - 1 point awarded all races) (* signifies that driver lead race for at least one lap - 1 point awarded all races)

24 Hours of Silverstone results

Post-BTCC
Recently Dowling has driven in the BRSCC Sports and Saloon Car Trophy in a TVR Sagaris.

External links
 BTCC Pages profile.

Living people
British Touring Car Championship drivers
Britcar 24-hour drivers
Britcar drivers 
People from Watford
1968 births